Malaysia participated in the 2015 Southeast Asian Games in Singapore from 5 to 16 June 2015.

Competitors
The Malaysian contingent was represented by 659 athletes consisting of 356 men and 303 women. The contingent's feat of collecting 62 gold medals has exceeded the 48 gold medal targets set by the National Sports Council.

Medal summary

Medal by sport

Medal by Date

Medallists

Multiple Medalists

References

External links

Nations at the 2015 Southeast Asian Games
2015
Southeast Asian Games